Chile competed at the 2020 Summer Olympics in Tokyo. Originally scheduled to take place from 24 July to 9 August 2020, the Games were postponed to 23 July to 8 August 2021, because of the COVID-19 pandemic. Since the nation's debut in 1896, Chilean athletes have appeared in all but five editions of the Summer Olympics of the modern era. Chile did not attend the 1932 Summer Olympics in Los Angeles at the period of the worldwide Great Depression and was also part of the US-led boycott, when Moscow hosted the 1980 Summer Olympics.

Chile failed to win any Olympic medals in Tokyo, the third consecutive Olympic Games it has failed to do so.

Competitors
The following is the list of number of competitors participating in the Games:

Archery

One Chilean archer qualified for the men's individual recurve at the Games by winning the silver medal and obtaining one of three available spots at the 2021 Pan American Championships in Monterrey, Mexico.

Athletics

Chilean athletes further achieved the entry standards, either by qualifying time or by world ranking, in the following track and field events (up to a maximum of 3 athletes in each event):

Field events

Canoeing

Sprint
Chilean canoeists qualified two boats in each of the following distances for the Games through the 2019 ICF Canoe Sprint World Championships in Szeged, Hungary.

Qualification Legend: FA = Qualify to final (medal); FB = Qualify to final B (non-medal)

Cycling

Road
Chile entered one rider to compete in the women's Olympic road race, by virtue of her top 100 individual finish (for women) in the UCI World Ranking.

Mountain biking
Chile entered one mountain biker to compete in the men's cross-country race by finishing in the top two of the under-23 division at the 2019 UCI Mountain Bike World Championships in Mont-Sainte-Anne, Canada.

BMX
Chile entered one BMX rider to compete in the women's freestyle, by finishing in the top two at the 2019 UCI Urban Cycling World Championships in Chengdu, China.

Equestrian

Chile entered one equestrian rider into the Olympic competition by finishing among the top fifteen and securing the last of four available slots in the individual jumping at the 2019 Pan American Games in Lima, Peru. Meanwhile, one eventing rider was added to the Chilean roster by finishing in the top two, outside the group selection, of the individual FEI Olympic Rankings for Group E (Central and South America). The eventing quota was later withdrawn.

With Bermuda failing to comply with the minimum eligibility requirements, Chile received an invitation from FEI to send a dressage rider to the Games, as the next highest-ranked eligible nation within the individual FEI Olympic Rankings for Groups D and E (North, Central and South America).

Dressage

Qualification Legend: Q = Qualified for the final; q = Qualified for the final as a lucky loser

Jumping

Fencing

Chile entered one fencer into the Olympic competition. Katina Proestakis claimed a spot in the women's foil by winning the final match at the Pan American Zonal Qualifier in San José, Costa Rica.

Football

Summary

Women's tournament

Chile women's football team qualified for the first time at the Olympics by winning the CAF–CONMEBOL playoff against Cameroon.

Team roster

Group play

Golf

Chile entered two male golfers into the Olympic tournament. Joaquín Niemann (world no. 31) and Mito Pereira (world no. 146) qualified directly among the top 60 eligible players for the men's event based on the IGF World Rankings.

Gymnastics

Artistic
Chile entered two artistic gymnast into the Olympic competition. Set to compete at her third straight Games, Simona Castro received a spare berth from the women's apparatus events, as one of the twelve highest-ranked gymnasts, neither part of the team nor qualified directly through the all-around, at the 2019 World Championships in Stuttgart, Germany.

Men

Women

Judo

Chile qualified one judoka for the women's extra-lightweight category (48 kg) at the Games. Mary Dee Vargas accepted a continental berth from the Americas as the nation's top-ranked judoka outside of direct qualifying position in the IJF World Ranking List of June 28, 2021.

Modern pentathlon
 
Chilean athletes qualified for the following spots to compete in modern pentathlon. London 2012 Olympian Esteban Bustos secured a selection in men's event by winning the silver medal and finishing among the top two for Latin America at the 2019 Pan American Games in Lima.

Rowing

Chile qualified one boat in the men's lightweight double sculls for the Games by winning the silver medal and securing the first of three berths available at the 2021 FISA Americas Olympic Qualification Regatta in Rio de Janeiro, Brazil.

Qualification Legend: FA=Final A (medal); FB=Final B (non-medal); FC=Final C (non-medal); FD=Final D (non-medal); FE=Final E (non-medal); FF=Final F (non-medal); SA/B=Semifinals A/B; SC/D=Semifinals C/D; SE/F=Semifinals E/F; QF=Quarterfinals; R=Repechage

Sailing

Chilean sailors qualified one boat in each of the following classes through the class-associated World Championships, and the continental regattas.

M = Medal race; EL = Eliminated – did not advance into the medal race

Shooting

Chilean shooters achieved quota places for the following events by virtue of their best finishes at the 2018 ISSF World Championships, the 2019 ISSF World Cup series, the 2019 Pan American Games, and Championships of the Americas, as long as they obtained a minimum qualifying score (MQS) by 31 May 2020.

Skateboarding

Chile entered one skateboarder to compete in the women's park at the Games. With the cancellation of the 2021 World Park Championships, Josefina Varas accepted an invitation from the World Skate, as one of the top-four skateboarders outside the World Rankings of June 30, 2021.

Surfing

Chile sent one surfer to compete in the men's shortboard race at the Games. Manuel Selman finished among the top two of his preliminary heat to secure one of the five available places at the 2021 ISA World Surfing Games in El Sunzal and La Bocana, El Salvador.

Swimming 

Chilean swimmers further achieved qualifying standards in the following events (up to a maximum of 2 swimmers in each event at the Olympic Qualifying Time (OQT), and potentially 1 at the Olympic Selection Time (OST)):

Table tennis
 
Chile entered one athlete into the table tennis competition at the Games for the first time since London 2012. Making her Olympic comeback after her debut in Athens 2004, María Paulina Vega scored the initial-stage final match triumph to book one of the available places in the women's singles at the Latin American Qualification Tournament in Rosario, Argentina.

Taekwondo

Chile entered one athlete into the taekwondo competition at the Games. 2019 Pan American Games bronze medalist Fernanda Aguirre secured a spot in the women's lightweight category (57 kg) with a top two finish at the 2020 Pan American Qualification Tournament in San José, Costa Rica. However, Aguirre was forced to withdraw from the Games after testing positive for COVID-19.

Tennis

Chile entered one tennis players into the Olympic tournament. Tomás Barrios secured an outright berth in the men's singles by advancing to the final match at the 2019 Pan American Games in Lima.

Triathlon

Chile entered two triathletes (one per gender) to compete at the Olympics. Remarkably going to her fourth straight Games, Bárbara Riveros was selected among the top 26 triathletes vying for qualification in the women's event based on the individual ITU World Rankings of 15 June 2021, with rookie Diego Moya topping the field of triathletes from the Americas on the men's side.

Volleyball

Beach
Chile men's beach volleyball pair qualified directly for the Olympics by virtue of their nation's top 15 placement in the FIVB Olympic Rankings of 13 June 2021.

Weightlifting

Chile entered two weightlifters (one per gender) into the Olympic competition. Two-time Olympian María Fernanda Valdés finished sixth of the eight highest-ranked weightlifters in the women's 87 kg category based on the IWF Absolute World Rankings, with rookie Arley Méndez topping the field of weightlifters from the American zone in the men's 81 kg category based on the IWF Absolute Continental Rankings.

Wrestling

Chile qualified one wrestler for the men's Greco-Roman 130 kg into the Olympic competition, by progressing to the top two finals at the 2020 Pan American Qualification Tournament in Ottawa, Canada.

Greco-Roman

See also
Chile at the 2019 Pan American Games
Chile at the 2020 Summer Paralympics

References

Nations at the 2020 Summer Olympics
2020
2021 in Chilean sport